Natronolimnohabitans innermongolicus is a species of archaea in the family Natrialbaceae. It has been proposed that Haloterrigena turkmenica be reclassified as Natronolimnohabitans innermongolicus due to the genome sequence of Haloterrigena turkmenica being contaminated in a previous study.

References

External links

Halobacteria
Archaea described in 2005